Yellow Caesar  is a 1941 propaganda film produced by Ealing Studios and Michael Balcon and directed by Alberto Cavalcanti. The screenwriters were Michael Foot, later leader of the Labour party, and Frank Owen credited under the pseudonym Michael Frank.

Synopsis
Yellow Caesar is billed as an "assessment" of the life and rise to power of the self-styled Il Duce, Italian dictator Benito Mussolini. Writing for the Screenonline website, Mark Duguid comments that the 24 minute short "is an unusually direct piece of agit-prop and probably the most striking of the 30-odd propaganda shorts released by Ealing Studios during WWII." The film traces Mussolini's years as a trade unionist thug and his role as a fascist demagogue.

Reception
Whilst generally well received by British audiences, there were doubts about the film's reception in neutral Eire, where censors had previously refused to pass Charlie Chaplin's The Great Dictator.

Cast
 Douglas Byng – English Sympathiser
 Marcel King – Mussolini (voice)
 Sam Lee – Mussolini (voice)
 Lito Masconas - Radio Announcer
 Max Spiro - Mussolini (voice)
 Feliks Topolski – Cartoonist
 Jack Warrock -  Mussolini (voice)

References

External links
 

British documentary films
1941 films
British World War II propaganda films
Documentary films about Benito Mussolini
Ealing Studios films
1941 documentary films
British black-and-white films